Isona is a locality located in the municipality of Isona i Conca Dellà, in Province of Lleida province, Catalonia, Spain. As of 2020, it has a population of 570. Isona is the capital of the municipality of Isona i Conca Dellà.

Geography 
Isona is located 95km northeast of Lleida.

References

Populated places in the Province of Lleida